Buchanosteus is an extinct genus of arthrodire placoderm.  Its fossils have been found in Early Devonian-aged marine strata throughout Asia and Australia. It contains the following species:
B. confertituberculatus, the type species, is known from several specimens found from the Emsian-aged Taemas-Weejasper Reef in what is now New South Wales, Australia.  It coexisted sympatrically with other buchanosteid genera there.
B. guangxianensis is known primarily from a well-preserved, albeit incomplete endocranium from Pragian-aged deposits near Guangxi, China.  It is compared to another buchanosteid, the "giant" Exutaspis from the late Emsian Wuding Formation in Yunnan.
B. nuricus is known from one or two specimens from Emsian strata in the Qaranghandy Region in Kazakhstan, and named for the Nura River.  Is very similar in anatomy to B. confertituberculatus

References

Buchanosteidae
Placoderms of Asia
Placoderms of Australia